Vesce is a municipality and village in Tábor District in the South Bohemian Region of the Czech Republic. It has about 300 inhabitants.

Administrative parts
Villages of Čeraz and Mokrá are administrative parts of Vesce.

References

Villages in Tábor District